The Spring Shopping Mall is a shopping mall in Kuching, Sarawak, Malaysia. Located at Persiaran Spring, it was opened in January 2008. It was the largest mall in Sarawak since its establishment until Boulevard Shopping Mall opened in 2013.

It has two anchor tenants which are Parkson and Ta Kiong Supermarket.

The Spring Shopping Mall has the capacity to house more than 150 shopping outlets spread out over three above-ground floors and a basement.

Retail outlets
Aside from its main anchor tenants, tHe Spring Shopping Mall contains a wide variety of well-known international brands. These include fashion names such as Coach New York, Cotton On, Esprit, Fossil, H&M, HLA, Levi's, Padini and Uniqlo, lingerie stores including La Senza, Triumph and Victoria's Secret, jewelry stores like Habib Jewels and Pandora, personal care and cosmetics stores such as Bath & Body Works, Clarins, Dior, L'Occitane en Provence, M·A·C, Sephora, Shu Uemura and The Face Shop, the 100-yen shop Daiso, retail stores including Toys "R" Us, footwear firms like Aldo, Bata Shoes, Hush Puppies and Skechers, chain stores such as Guardian, Sasa and Watsons, consumer electronics retail store like Huawei, Samsung and Sony, and the bookstore MPH.

In addition, a food court, several cafes and food stalls can be found inside tHe Spring Shopping Mall, including Big Apple Donuts and Coffee, Boost Juice, Kenny Rogers Roasters, KFC, Llaollao, Nando's, Sakae Sushi, Secret Recipe, Starbucks and Tealive.

Entertainment
The most well-known of entertainment options at tHe Spring Shopping Mall is MBO Cinemas which commenced operations in June 2009 and can be found on the top floor offering an 8-screen cineplex. It was MBO Cinemas' first outlet in East Malaysia and simultaneously introduced 3D film to Sarawak.

Location
tHe Spring Shopping Mall is situated before the Jalan Simpang Tiga flyover. It also lies directly opposite another mall, the ST3 Shopping Mall, which is accessible through a linked pedestrian bridge. In addition to both the Kuching International Airport and the city's central business district is about 15-minute drive away, tHe Spring is also situated near the Swinburne University of Technology and various government offices.

Transportation
The Spring Shopping Mall has a dedicated area just beyond its premium carpark area where buses, taxicabs and vehicle for hire companies pick up and drop off passengers. Alternatively, customers may cross the pedestrian bridge to the ST3 Shopping Mall which is served by buses K8 and K11 of the Kuching City Public Link.

See also
 List of shopping malls in Malaysia

References

External links 
 
 

Shopping malls in Sarawak
Shopping malls established in 2008
2008 establishments in Malaysia
Buildings and structures in Kuching